Ravenstruther is a small hamlet in South Lanarkshire, Scotland, near the town of Lanark. In 1517 the lands of Carstairs and Ravenstruther were granted to William Sommerville. Ravenstruther was then known as Ronstruther. The village is home to a caravan and camping park.

References

External links
 Archaeological finds in Ravenstruther
 Caravan park

Villages in South Lanarkshire